Teariki Ben-Nicholas (born 18 July 1995) is a New Zealand rugby union player of Cook Islands descent, who plays for Castres Olympique in the French Top 14. His playing position is flanker. He has signed for the Highlanders squad in 2020.

Reference list

External links
 

1995 births
New Zealand rugby union players
Living people
Rugby union flankers
Tasman rugby union players
Wellington rugby union players
Highlanders (rugby union) players
Castres Olympique players